George (Yuri) Rudolph Perpich (Prpic) (June 22, 1920 – May 26, 1993) was an American football Tackle in the All-America Football Conference for the Brooklyn Dodgers and Baltimore Colts.  He played college football at Georgetown University and was drafted in the eleventh round of the 1943 NFL Draft by the Washington Redskins.

References

1920 births
1993 deaths
People from Hibbing, Minnesota
Players of American football from Minnesota
American football offensive tackles
Baltimore Colts (1947–1950) players
Brooklyn Dodgers (AAFC) players
Yugoslav emigrants to the United States